The Rabbit River is a  tributary of the Bois de Sioux River of Minnesota in the United States. Via the Bois de Sioux River, Red River of the North, Lake Winnipeg, and the Nelson River, it is part of the Hudson Bay watershed.

The river was named for the varying hare, which is common in the area.

See also
List of rivers of Minnesota

References

Minnesota Watersheds

USGS Hydrologic Unit Map - State of Minnesota (1974)

Rivers of Wilkin County, Minnesota
Rivers of Grant County, Minnesota
Rivers of Otter Tail County, Minnesota
Rivers of Minnesota
Tributaries of Hudson Bay